Vandyke is an unincorporated community located in Comanche County, in the U.S. state of Texas. According to the Handbook of Texas, the community had a population of 20 in 2000.

History
The community was named for Van Dyke Frost. A post office was established at Vandyke in 1903 and remained in operation until 1905. The community also had a church in operation. Its population was estimated as 15 in 1933, 30 in 1939, and 20 from 1980 through 2000.

Geography
Vandyke is located on Texas State Highway 16 in north-central Comanche County.

Education
Van Dyke Frost donated land for a school to be built in the early 1870s. Today, the community is served by the Comanche Independent School District.

References

Unincorporated communities in Comanche County, Texas
Unincorporated communities in Texas